John W. Hausermann  or "Judge" Hausermann (December 14, 1867 – July 11, 1965) was an American colonial army officer and gold mine owner in the Philippines. Hausermann was born in Ohio and came to the Philippines in 1898 as a second lieutenant during the Spanish–American War. After the war he remained in the Philippines and founded the gold mining company Benguet Mining Consolidated whose two largest gold mines (the Antamok Gulch and the Balatoc) supplied gold to the U.S. Department of Treasury. Benguet Mining Consolidated was an important for its role as the defendant in the Perkins v. Benguet Mining Co. U.S. Supreme Court case of 1952.

His son, John William Hausermann Jr. (1909-1986) was born in Manila, and became a composer.

References

1867 births
1965 deaths
American expatriates in the Philippines
American military personnel of the Spanish–American War
Gold mining companies
United States Army officers